Ulothrix aequalis is a small algae.

Description
Ulothrix aequalis  is a small uniseriate species (that is, cells in a row). The cells are cylindrical, 12–22 microns broad and 26–30 microns long. They are attached a cell or rhizoids at the base.

References

Ulotrichaceae
Taxa named by Friedrich Traugott Kützing